Pointe de la Sana is a mountain of Savoie, France. It lies in the Massif de la Vanoise range and has an elevation of 3,436 metres above sea level.

References

Alpine three-thousanders
Mountains of the Alps
Mountains of Savoie